Hilliard is a city in Franklin County, Ohio, United States. The population was 37,114 at the 2020 census. It is a suburb of Columbus and part of Norwich Township. Hilliard is home to the Early Television Museum (the only one of its kind in United States), the second largest First Responders Park in the United States, and  Heritage Rail Trail. Hilliard also has the only flag pole from the World Trade Center that is not in a museum. The flag pole is located in front of the fire department on Northwest Parkway. The Hilliard Historical Society maintains a historical village near the Franklin County Fairgrounds.

History
In 1852, John Reed Hilliard bought  of farmland in western Franklin County, Ohio from Hoseah High and Abraham Wendell. Geographically, the Hilliard area is between Big Darby Creek on the west and the Scioto River on the east. Originally called Hilliard's Station, the town grew around the railroad route of the Piqua and Indiana Railroad station, which bisected the former Hilliard farmland. Hilliard's Station served as an ideal shipping point for agricultural products going to market and supplies coming to the farmers in the area. The original Hilliard area was platted by John Hilliard on September 1, 1853.

Until the mid 20th century, the railroad station and Main Street were the town center. In 1854, a post office was established in Hilliard's Station and the word Station was dropped from the town name. The Village of Hilliard became incorporated on July 13, 1869 with a population of 280 residents. In 1886 the first railroad station was located on the north side of the tracks, west of Main Street, and remained there until 1962 when all railroad services ceased. The original train station has been restored and remains in Hilliard's historical Weaver Park. The original platted area contained a mix of residences and businesses of varying ages and architecture.

The construction of three large residential subdivisions in the 1950s brought explosive growth to Hilliard. The connection to the Columbus regional sewer and water systems in the 1960s opened up the area to development. The Village of Hilliard gained city status officially from the Ohio Secretary of State by attaining a population of 5,633 on December 12, 1960.

With the completion of the I-270 outerbelt in the early 1970s, a second wave of explosive growth came to the area. Land uses in Hilliard continue to be a mix of residential and commercial development. A rich heritage of residential structures and architectural styles can be found in the historic district along Norwich Street.

Geography
Hilliard is located at  (40.034310, -83.142678). It is bordered on the east by Columbus and Upper Arlington, on the north by Columbus and Dublin, on the south by Galloway and Columbus, and to the west lies open farmland. Downtown Columbus lies in a distance to the southeast, its skyline visible at times when crossing bridges.

Demographics

2010 census
As of the 2010 census, there were 28,435 people, 10,198 households, and 7,612 families residing in the city. The racial makeup of the city was 88.5% White, 3.0% African American, 0.2% Native American, 5.6% Asian, 0.8% from other races, and 1.9% from two or more races. Hispanic or Latino of any race were 2.3% of the population.

There were 10,198 households, of which 44.5% had children under the age of 18 living with them, 61.8% were married couples living together, 9.2% had a female householder with no husband present, 3.7% had a male householder with no wife present, and 25.4% were non-families. 21.2% of all households were made up of individuals, and 7.9% had someone living alone who was 65 years of age or older. The average household size was 2.77 and the average family size was 3.26.

The median age in the city was 35.9 years. 30.1% of residents were under the age of 18; 6.4% were between the ages of 18 and 24; 28.7% were from 25 to 44; 26.2% were from 45 to 64; and 8.6% were 65 years of age or older. The gender makeup of the city was 48.8% male and 51.2% female.

2000 census
As of the census of 2000, there were 24,230 people, 8,577 households, and 6,492 families residing in the city. The population density was 2,174.8 people per square mile (839.8/km2). There were 8,957 housing units at an average density of 804.0 per square mile (310.4/km2). The racial makeup of the city was 85.1% White, 3.2% African American, 0.17% Native American, 1.48% Asian, 0.02% Pacific Islander, 5.72% from other races, and 1.32% from two or more races. Hispanic or Latino of any race were 4.56% of the population.

There were 8,577 households, out of which 46.3% had children under the age of 18 living with them, 64.7% were married couples living together, 7.8% had a female householder with no husband present, and 24.3% were non-families. 19.5% of all households were made up of individuals, and 5.7% had someone living alone who was 65 years of age or older. The average household size was 2.80 and the average family size was 3.26.

In the city the population was spread out, with 32.1% under the age of 18, 5.5% from 18 to 24, 37.8% from 25 to 44, 17.4% from 45 to 64, and 7.2% who were 65 years of age or older. The median age was 33 years. For every 100 females, there were 96.5 males. For every 100 females age 18 and over, there were 92.6 males.

The median income for a household in the city was $69,015, and the median income for a family was $76,207. Males had a median income of $50,551 versus $35,733 for females. The per capita income for the city was $28,496. About 0.6% of families and 2.2% of the population were below the poverty line, including 1.0% of those under age 18 and 8.3% of those age 65 or over.

Political Affiliation 
According to The New York Times' "Extremely Detailed Map of the 2020 Election Results", Hilliard residents generally voted for Joe Biden over Donald Trump in the 2020 Presidential Election. Two small sections of Hilliard south of Cemetery Road and an additional section north of Cemetery Road voted for Trump with margins of +1.5, +4, and +9.3 points respectively, with all other sections of Hilliard voting for Biden, ranging from +2.3 points to +30 points.

Hilliard overlaps three congressional districts; Ohio's 3rd congressional district, Ohio's 12th congressional district, and Ohio's 15th congressional district.

Education
The Hilliard City School District encompasses all of the original Brown and Norwich Township boundaries, the actual city of Hilliard, a portion of Columbus that is about the same size as that within Hilliard, as well as parts of the city of Dublin, and parts of Galloway. There are fourteen elementary schools (Alton Darby, Avery, Beacon, Britton, Brown, Darby Creek, Hilliard Crossing, Hilliard Horizon, Hoffman Trails, J.W. Reason, Norwich, Ridgewood, Scioto Darby, and Washington), two sixth-grade schools (Station and Tharp), three middle schools (Heritage, Weaver, and Memorial), and three high schools (Darby, Davidson, and Bradley) in the district.  The high school sports teams are named the Panthers, Wildcats, and Jaguars, respectively.  Also in the city of Hilliard is a K-8 Roman Catholic school: Saint Brendan School, and a K-8 Islamic school, Sunrise Academy.

Public safety
Hilliard maintains its own Division of Police located at 5171 Northwest Parkway. The 55 Officer Division has a Patrol Bureau, Records Bureau, Detective Bureau, Special Investigations Unit, Property Room, Motorcycle Unit, Bike Patrol Unit, Community Resource/Training Bureau, and three K-9 Officers. The Hilliard Division of Police also provides police services for Norwich Township.

Norwich Township provides fire protection for the City of Hilliard and Norwich Township. The Norwich Township Fire Department maintains three fire stations (Stations 81, 82 and 83). Station 81 is a joint venture between the City of Hilliard and Norwich Township, housing Norwich Township Fire Station 81 and the Hilliard Division of Police.

Recreation

For recreation, Hilliard has two public pools (Hilliard Family Aquatic Center and Clyde "Butch" Seidle Community Pool), a Community Center/Senior Center next to the HFAC, a Splash Pad at Hilliard's Station Park, and many public baseball and soccer fields, as well as basketball and sport activities. The Recreation Department oversees approximately 27 parks. A few other parks in the area not owned by the City include Homestead and Franks Park. The Heritage Rail Trail is in Hilliard with the trail head located in Old Hilliard on Center Street. There are 41 miles of multipurpose trails.

Community events

Fourth of July Festivities
Hilliard annually hosts a Fourth of July parade and has a moderately sized fireworks display that overlooks the west pool/municipal park.

Franklin County Fair
In 2017, the Franklin County Fair celebrated its 100th fair in Hilliard. The fair is held in July each year.

Old Hilliardfest Art & Street Fair
The Old Hilliardfest Art & Street Fair is held in downtown Hilliard each year the second Saturday of each September and is sponsored by the Hilliard Civic Association. The festival includes two stages of music primarily country/western. There are several food trucks; a large variety of community organizations, artists, and other various vendors; lots for kids to do, including inflatables, carnival games and rides, face painting, arts and crafts activities; and more.

Celebration at the Station
A weekly summer concert series held at Hilliard's Station Park in Old Hilliard. Events include live music, food trucks and a Designated Outdoor Refreshment Area (DORA).

Sports

The largest sporting events in Hilliard are the football games of the three Hilliard high schools; Hilliard Bradley, Hilliard Darby, and Hilliard Davidson. Basketball for these high schools is also popular, though many other sporting events are played by the kids at the middle and high schools. These sports include ice hockey, tennis, soccer, volleyball, lacrosse, and many others.

State football championships
Hilliard Davidson won the Division I state championship in football in 2006 and 2009. They also won regional championship titles in 1993, 2005, 2006, 2009 and 2010.

State cross country championships
Hilliard Davidson won both the girls' and boys' state championships in cross country in 2002. This is the only time in Division I Ohio high school history that the same school has won both in the same year. The boys' team also placed second in the state in 2008, continuing the longest active streak of consecutive appearances at the state meet among Division I schools with nine. In 2011, the girls' team went on to win the regional meet and qualify for the state meet. India Johnson of Hilliard Davidson was the 2016 Division 1 state champion and qualified for the Foot Locker Cross Country Nationals in 2016 and took 4th.

State soccer championship
Hilliard Davidson won the state soccer title in 2008, and finished runner-up in 2015.

State volleyball championships
Hilliard Darby boys' volleyball has won the state championship in the 2012-2013 and 2014–2015 school years. In 2012, 2017, and 2018 they were state runners-up. They have also appeared in the State final four in 2003, 2005, 2007, 2008, 2010, 2011, and 2014. Prior to the split of the Hilliard schools, Hilliard High School won a state championship in 1991.

Other sports
Hilliard Hockey Club Varsity team won the CBJ cup in 2020. They then went on to finish 5th in the state. Also are now owned by Dayton Hockey Association and Spencer Thompson. Roll Stealth.
Hilliard Darby Softball won the state championship in 2000, as well as made it to the state semi-finals in 2009
Hilliard Bradley competition cheer won the state championship in 2011. They were state runners-up in 2010.
Hilliard Darby baseball made it to the state semi-finals in 2019

Hilliard youth organizations
Some youth club teams include the Northwest Football League (NWFL), the Hilliard Baseball Association (HBA), Hilliard Wildcats High School Hockey Club, the Hilliard Girls Softball Association (HGSA), the Hilliard Optimist Basketball League (HOBL), Hilliard Lynx Field Hockey, the Hilliard Ohio Soccer Association (HOSA), the Hilliard Youth Lacrosse Association (HYLA), and Northwest FC Youth Soccer (NWFC).

Education
List of schools:
 Hilliard City School District
 Hilliard Davidson High School
 Hilliard Darby High School
 Hilliard Bradley High School
 Hilliard Memorial Middle School
 Hilliard Weaver Middle School
 Hilliard Heritage Middle School
 Alton Darby Elementary
 Britton Elementary
 Norwich Elementary
 Darby Creek Elementary
 J.W. Reason Elementary
 Ridgewood Elementary
 Beacon Elementary
 Avery Elementary
 Washington Elementary
 Horizon Elementary
 Crossing Elementary
 Scioto Darby Elementary
 Hoffman Trails Elementary
 Brown Elementary
 HCSD Preschool
 Sixth Grade Tharp
 Sixth Grade Station
 St. Brendan School
 Sunrise Academy

Transportation and Infrastructure 
Hilliard's main streets are Cemetery Road and Main Street/Hilliard Rome Road. The city does not have any major Ohio state routes or US Routes within its immediate vicinity, however Hilliard's eastern end is accessible by Interstate 270, a ring road serving Columbus suburbs known locally as the "Outerbelt".

No major railways nor rail-based transport run to, from, through, or within Hilliard; however, there is a park and ride on Cemetery Road close to I-270.

Hilliard is served by John Glenn International Airport, which additionally serves a large majority of all commercial flights out of the Columbus area. Additionally, Hilliard is located extremely close to Don Scott Airport for general aviation and Ohio State University aviation classes.

Notable people
 Mike Furrey - former football wide receiver and safety, currently head coach of the Limestone Saints

References

External links
 City website
 Hilliard Ohio Historical Society
 Hilliard Chamber of Commerce
 DestinationHilliard

 
Cities in Ohio
Cities in Franklin County, Ohio
Populated places established in 1853
1853 establishments in Ohio